Rhizomelic chondrodysplasia punctata is a rare developmental brain disorder characterized by abnormally short arms and legs (rhizomelia), seizures, recurrent respiratory tract infections and congenital cataracts. 

The cause is a genetic mutation that results in low levels of plasmalogens, which are substances used in many ways throughout the body.

Signs and symptoms
Rhizomelic chondrodysplasia punctata has the following symptoms:
 Bilateral shortening of the femur, resulting in short legs
 Post-natal growth problems (deficiency)
 Cataracts
 Intellectual disability
 Possible seizures
 Possible infections of respiratory tract

Genetics
This condition is a consequence of mutations in the PEX7 gene, the GNPAT gene (which is located on chromosome 1) or the AGPS gene. The condition is acquired in an autosomal recessive manner.

Pathophysiology

The mechanism of rhizomelic chondrodysplasia punctata in the case of type 1 of this condition one finds that peroxisome objective is PEX7, in peroxisome assembly. There are 3 pathways that count on PEX7 and are:
AGPS (catalyzes plasmalogen biosynthesis)
PhYH (catalyzes catabolism of phytanic acid)
ACAA1 (catalyzes beta-oxidation of VLCFA - straight)

Diagnosis

The diagnosis of rhizomelic chondrodysplasia punctata can be based on genetic testing as well as radiography results, plus a physical examination of the individual.

Types
 Type 1 (RCDP1) is associated with PEX7 mutations; these are peroxisome biogenesis disorders where proper assembly of peroxisomes is impaired.
 Type 2 (RCDP2) is associated with DHAPAT mutations 
 Type 3 (RCDP3) is associated with AGPS mutations

Treatment
Management of rhizomelic chondrodysplasia punctata can include physical therapy; additionally orthopedic procedures improved function sometimes in affected people.

Prognosis 
The prognosis is poor in this condition, and most children die before the age of 10.  However, some survive to adulthood, especially if they have a non-classical (mild) form of RCDP.

Children with classical, or severe, RCDP1 have severe developmental disabilities.  Most of them achieve early developmental skills, such as smiling, but they will not develop skills expected from a baby older than six months (such as feeding themselves or walking).  By contrast, children with non-classical mild RCDP1 often learn to walk and talk.

See also 
 Plasmalogen
 Peroxisomal disorder

References

Further reading

External links 

Genodermatoses
Peroxisomal disorders